Engelsina "Gelya" Sergeyevna Markizova (later Cheshkova, ; 16 November 1928 – 11 May 2004) was a Buryat woman who achieved fame as a child after being depicted in a photo embracing the Soviet leader Joseph Stalin, an image which became one of the most enduring propaganda symbols of the Stalinist era, when it was widespread in schools, pioneer's camps and children's institutions.

Biography
Daughter of the People's Commissar for Agriculture of the Buryat-Mongol Autonomous Province , in January 1936 she was pictured in a photo with Joseph Stalin which was later used for propaganda purposes after she found Stalin at a Kremlin state ceremony and presented him with a bouquet of flowers reportedly saying "These flowers are for Comrade Stalin from the children of the Buryat-Mongol Republic". Stalin then picked her up in a hug as cameras all around snapped up the now iconic image On 29 June 1936 the photo was published on the front page of Pravda, the newspaper of the Communist Party. The image spread after its publication, finding its way into kindergartens, hospitals and schools across the Soviet Union, and it was later turned into a marble sculpture by Georgi Lavrov, a renowned sculptor of the time propelling Markizova to instant fame, and leading her to receive preferential treatment in school and Communist Party meetings.

In 1937 her father, who was a provincial official for the Buryatia region, was taken from their home by secret police agents, standing accused of being a Japanese spy and a Trotskyite. Despite appeals to Stalin from her mother through Engelsina Markizova for his clemency, he was executed in July 1938 on the false charge that he was a Japanese spy, a Trotskyite, a terrorist and subversive plotting against Stalin. Now the daughter of an enemy of the people, Markizova found herself shunned by her classmates whilst her mother was imprisoned for a year and ultimately deported to southern Kazakhstan, dying there at the age of 32 in what has been described as either a "mysterious accident", "a murder that authorities never investigated", or suicide.  Now an orphan, Markizova lived with relatives in Moscow. At this point, rather than removing or altering her photos, Soviet propagandists decided that it was easier to deliberately misattribute the identity of the girl depicted in them than remove all the photos, sculptures and mosaics. Therefore, the girl in the picture would be thereon officially identified as Mamlakat Nakhangova, a Tajik girl who had earned the Order of Lenin by working as a cotton picker. The images began to slowly disappear post-1953, with the rise of de-Stalinization.

Later in life, Markizova became an Orientalist scholar, specializing in China and India, married, remarried and died in 2004 with three children only learning, like the rest of Russia, the extent of Stalin's bloody rule after his death.

Georgi Lavrov, who immortalised the image in marble, was later imprisoned for 17 years in Stalin's labor camps, surviving only by good luck.

References

1928 births
2004 deaths
Buryat people
Propaganda in the Soviet Union
Great Purge victims from Russia
Soviet sinologists
Indologists
Women orientalists